The Women's 100 metre freestyle competition at the 2017 World Championships was held on 27 and 28 July 2017.

Records
Prior to the competition, the existing world and championship records were as follows.

During the competition, prior to this 100 metre event, on 23 July 2017, Sarah Sjöström set a new world record in the 4×100 metre freestyle relay final; her mark was at 51.71.

Results

Heats
The heats were held on 27 July at 09:30.

Swim-off
The swim-off was held on 27 July at 10:58.

Semifinals
The semifinals were held on 27 July at 17:41.

Semifinal 1

Semifinal 2

Final
The final was held on 28 July at 17:32.

References

Women's 100 metre freestyle
2017 in women's swimming